Joey Alders (born 6 August 1999) is a Dutch racing driver from Den Helder. He is the reigning Asian Formula Renault Series and Asian Formula 3 champion, he won both single-seater championships in his debut year and is currently competing in the 2021 European Le Mans Series in the Eurointernational LMP3.

Career

Karting
Alders started karting in 2009 in The Netherlands when he was 10 where he races a string of successful campaigns, which includes winning the Dutch Championship Academy in 2012.

ADAC Formula 4 Championship
In 2018, Alders made his single-seater debut in the ADAC F4 championship with Van Amersfoort Racing. Alders' highest finish was at the second race at Hockenheimring where he finished 5th, at the end of the season he finished 11th with 44 points.

Asian Formula Renault Series
Alders tested for and moved to BlackArts Racing for the 2019 Asian Formula Renault Series. Alders finished on the podium ten times, eight of which were race victories. Alders won the championship with 314 points, 49 points ahead of runner up Bruno Carneiro.

F3 Asian Championship
After his performance in the Asian formula Renault series, BlackArts Racing kept Alders to race in the F3 Asian Championship. On the 13 December 2019, the season kicked off at Sepang International Circuit where Alders won two of the three rounds. Alders would go on to win three more races and get a total of 11 podiums. In the final rounds three drivers could still win the title Jack Doohan, Nikita Mazepin and Alders. On the first race of the final round in Thailand, Doohan was leading the race ahead of Alders until a late puncture caused Doohan to limp to the end and finished 8th where Alders inherited the win. Alders won the championship with 266 points.

Formula Renault
Alders tested with MP Motorsport in the pre-season test at Monza. Due to the disruption caused by the COVID-19 pandemic, the preseason test immediately preceded the first round of the championship. It was later confirmed that Alders would contest the season with MP Motorsport

Racing record

Career summary

† As Alders was a guest driver, he was ineligible to score points.
* Season still in progress.

Complete ADAC Formula 4 Championship results
(key) (Races in bold indicate pole position; races in italics indicate points for the fastest lap)

Complete Asian Formula Renault Series results
(key) (Races in bold indicate pole position; races in italics indicate points for the fastest lap)

Complete F3 Asian Championship results
(key) (Races in bold indicate pole position; races in italics indicate points for the fastest lap)

Complete Formula Renault Eurocup results
(key) (Races in bold indicate pole position) (Races in italics indicate fastest lap)

Complete European Le Mans Series results

References

External links
 Official website
 

1999 births
Living people
Dutch racing drivers
ADAC Formula 4 drivers
F3 Asian Championship drivers
Formula Renault Eurocup drivers
MP Motorsport drivers
People from Anna Paulowna
Sportspeople from North Holland
Asian Formula Renault Challenge drivers
EuroInternational drivers
Van Amersfoort Racing drivers
BlackArts Racing drivers